Weidong Mao is an electrical engineer at Comcast Cable in Philadelphia. He was named a Fellow of the Institute of Electrical and Electronics Engineers (IEEE) in 2014 for his contributions to video on demand technologies and cloud computing.

References

Fellow Members of the IEEE
Living people
Year of birth missing (living people)
Place of birth missing (living people)
Comcast people
American electrical engineers